Akseløya (English: Axel Island) is a long, narrow island (about 8.5 km long and 1 km wide) at the mouth of Van Mijenfjorden, separating Van Mijenfjorden from Bellsund. It is separated from the mainland by Akselsundet to the north, and another narrow strait to the south. The islands are named after the schooner Aksel Thordsen, which was chartered by Adolf Erik Nordenskiöld for an expedition to Svalbard in 1864.

See also
List of lighthouses in Svalbard

References

Conway, W. M. 1906. No Man's Land: A History of Spitsbergen from Its Discovery in 1596 to the Beginning of the Scientific Exploration of the Country. Cambridge: At the University Press. 
 Norwegian Polar Institute Place Names of Svalbard Database

 
Islands of Svalbard
Lighthouses in Svalbard